= Museum of Portable Sound =

Digital sound project

The Museum of Portable Sound is a digital museum housed on an iPhone that explores sounds of daily life as well as the acoustic environments of London and many other cities worldwide.

The project was established in 2015 when founder John Kannenberg was a PhD student in museology and sound studies. Through mostly private bookings, drew 1,200 visitors in its first five years. It moved to encompass video during the COVID-19 pandemic during which it also showcased "The Golden Record", an excerpt of audio that NASA provided for the Voyager 1 and 2 flights.

Kannenberg, originally of Milwaukee, Wisconsin is a multimedia artist, curator, writer, and researcher who explores many facets of museology in his work and research. Kannenberg has been Director and Chief Curator of the institution since he started it in 2015.
